Alabama is a state in the Southeastern region of the United States. The state's primary industries are aerospace, education, health care, banking, and various heavy industries, including automobile manufacturing, mineral extraction, steel production and fabrication.

Largest firms 
This list shows firms in the Fortune 500, which ranks firms by total revenues reported before January 31, 2021. Only the top five firms (if available) are included as a sample.

Notable firms 
This list includes notable companies with primary headquarters located in the state. The industry and sector follow the Industry Classification Benchmark taxonomy. Organizations which have ceased operations are included and noted as defunct.

See also 
 Economy of Alabama

References

Alabama-related lists
Alabama